Johann Karl Werner Winter (October 25, 1923 – August 7, 2010) was a German Indo-European specialist and linguist.

Life
Winter was born in Haselau. His brother was killed during the Second World War. He studied under Ernst Fraenkel at the University of Kiel, where he later succeeded Fraenkel. Although he wrote hardly any individual volumes of his own, he established himself in the study of Tocharian and, as a result of his work as the editor of many series and work in general linguistics, he had far-reaching influence. Winter spent his life in his native Holstein. His students included Olav Hackstein, Peter Kuhlmann, and Christian T. Petersen. He is known for formulating Winter's law. He was appointed president of Societas Linguistica Europaea in 1991. He died in Preetz.

Distinctions 
 Honorary doctorate from the University of Poznań (1984)
 Honorary doctorate from the University of Kaliningrad (2000)

Main works 
 A Bantawa Dictionary (Berlin, 2003) 
 "Vom Genitiv im heutigen Deutsch" (The Genitive in Modern German; in: Zeitschrift für deutsche Sprache 22, pp. 21–35)
 Studia Tocharica. Selected Writings/Ausgewählte Beiträge (Poznań 1984).

References

External links 
 Obituary at The Linguist List

Linguists from Germany
Indo-Europeanists
Linguists of Indo-European languages
1923 births
2010 deaths
University of Kiel alumni